Jenny Lind was a Swedish opera singer.

Jenny Lind may also refer to:

Places
Qikiqtaryuaq, formerly Jenny Lind Island, in Nunavut, Canada
Jenny Lind, Glasgow, a district in Glasgow, Scotland, UK
Jenny Lind, Arkansas, an unincorporated community in the US
Jenny Lind, California, an unincorporated community in the US

Vehicles
Jenny Lind locomotive, a locomotive built in 1847 for the London and Brighton Railway
2-2-2, Whyte notation for the classification of steam locomotives usually called a Jenny Lind
Jenny Lind private railroad car
Steamboat Jenny Lind, a steamboat that exploded in 1853 in San Francisco Bay
Jenny Lind, a ship that wrecked on Kenn Reef in 1850

Other uses
Jenny Lind (film), a 1932 American film
Jenny Lind, a polka commonly played in Irish traditional music and Morris dance traditions
Farewell To Jenny Lynd, a song by Glaswegian singer-songwriter Kevin McDermott

See also 
 Jenny Lin (active from 1980s), Taiwanese-born American pianist
 Jenny Lind melon, a type of sweet cantaloupe with green flesh
 Jenny Lind Soup, a thick mixture with the consistency of wallpaper paste